Diffun, officially the Municipality of Diffun, is a 2nd class municipality in the province of Quirino, Philippines. According to the 2020 census, it has a population of 56,102 people.

Commercial establishments proliferated along the provincial road due to its proximity to Santiago City as the main commercial hub of the region.

Geography

Barangays
Diffun is politically subdivided into 33 barangays. These barangays are headed by elected officials: Barangay Captain, Barangay Council, whose members are called Barangay Councilors. All are elected every three years.

Climate

Demographics

Economy

Government
Diffun, belonging to the lone congressional district of the province of Quirino, is governed by a mayor designated as its local chief executive and by a municipal council as its legislative body in accordance with the Local Government Code. The mayor, vice mayor, and the councilors are elected directly by the people through an election which is being held every three years.

Elected officials

Education
The Schools Division of Quirino governs the town's public education system. The division office is a field office of the DepEd in Cagayan Valley region. The office governs the public and private elementary and public and private high schools throughout the municipality.

References

External links

Diffun Profile at PhilAtlas.com
[ Philippine Standard Geographic Code]
Philippine Census Information
Local Governance Performance Management System 

Municipalities of Quirino